Colden may refer to:

People
Alexander Colden, first recorded Postmaster of New York City
Cadwallader Colden (1688–1776), physician, farmer, surveyor, botanist, and lieutenant governor of the Province of New York
Cadwallader D. Colden (1769–1834), Colonel in the U.S. Army during the War of 1812, member of New York State Assembly, mayor of New York City, U.S. Representative, and member of New York State Senate
Cadwallader Colden Washburn (1818–1882), a founder of General Mills and a  representative from Wisconsin to the United States Congress
Charles J. Colden (1870–1938), a representative from California to the Seventy-third United States Congress
Charles S. Colden (1885–1960), American lawyer and politician
Jane Colden (1724–1766), U.S. botanist
Trevor Colden (b. 1994), a U.S. skateboarder
Colden Earles (b. 2003)

Places

England
Colden, West Yorkshire, a village in Calderdale
Colden Common, a village and civil parish in Hampshire

Isle of Man
Colden, a peak on the Isle of Man

United States
Colden, New York, a town in Erie County
Mount Colden, Adirondack Mountains, New York
Lake Colden  a lake in the Adirondack High Peaks, New York